Slieve Carr, also known as Slieve Cor or Corslieve, is a mountain with a height of  in County Mayo, Ireland. It is part of the Nephin Range and is beside Nephin Beg. On the summit is a burial cairn known as Laghtdauhybaun, from Leacht Dáithí Bháin, 'burial monument of white Dáithí'. This is believed to refer to Dathí, a king of Connacht in the 5th century.

See also
Lists of mountains in Ireland
Lists of mountains and hills in the British Isles
List of P600 mountains in the British Isles
List of Marilyns in the British Isles
List of Hewitt mountains in England, Wales and Ireland

References

External links
 Listing at peakbagger.com

Mountains and hills of County Mayo
Hewitts of Ireland
Marilyns of Ireland
Mountains under 1000 metres